is a Japanese video game franchise created by Keita Takahashi and developed and published by Namco (and subsequently Bandai Namco Entertainment). The series puts players in control of a young character called The Prince (also referred to as Dashing Prince or the Prince of All Cosmos) as he assists his father, the King of All Cosmos, in the re-creation of stars and planets by using a ball called a katamari to roll up objects. The first title in the series was Katamari Damacy for the PlayStation 2, which became a cult classic and led to several sequels and spin-offs.

Gameplay and setting

In most Katamari games, players typically control the player character, The Prince, as he is ordered to do various tasks by his father, the King of All Cosmos. 

In Katamari Damacy, The Prince is tasked with the job of rebuilding the stars and constellations that the King destroyed. To do this, the player combines as many objects into a singular ball, known as a katamari ball, that could become a star, constellations, or stardust. A katamari ball can roll up certain objects, depending on the Katamari's relative size to them. 

Players typically control the katamari using two analog sticks; players move forward and backward by pushing the analog sticks in that direction simultaneously. They can turn the katamari by pushing only one stick in the desired direction or pushing the sticks in opposite directions to do so faster (often described as 'tank controls'). Players may also do a 180 degree turn that causes The Prince to jump on the other side of the Katamari typically by pressing the two sticks down into the controller. Players may cause the katamari to roll at high speeds typically by rapidly moving the two sticks in opposite directions back and forth. Players may also cause The Prince to jump and get a better look at the world by pressing L1. More recently, players are given the ability called the "Prince Hop" as well as look at the world in the first person.

Before each level, the King will often go on a nonsensical rant to The Prince, and refers to himself in the first person plural. In most levels, players are presented with a specific size that they must reach as well as a time that they must reach it by. As the katamari collects more objects, it becomes larger, as demonstrated by a size chart on its HUD. In earlier levels, players are given a katamari similar to the Prince's size, which allows him to only roll up small objects such as tacks and ants. Later levels allow the katamari to grow much larger to the point where it can roll up buildings and clouds. As it becomes larger, the katamari is then able to pick up larger objects. Living creatures will sometimes attack the katamari if it is smaller than them; once it becomes a certain size, they will often attempt to flee from it. If the katamari is only barely able to pick a living creature up, they will be knocked away; if they are not rolled up in time, they will escape. If players are attacked or crash, the katamari will sometimes lose items. If players roll up a long, slender object such as a pencil, it will sometimes poke outwards and cause the katamari to roll awkwardly until more objects are rolled up. In more recent games, players can hit a glowing pillar that causes all items close to the katamari that are small enough to be sucked into it.

As players reach certain size milestones, the King will often appear in the middle of the screen and speak to players. In some levels, this will precede a cutscene alerting players that a new area has opened up. If players fail to reach this size in the time allotted, they are punished by the King. If they are able to reach the required size in time, they may continue making it bigger. At the end of the stage, they are judged on their size as well as the time it took to reach the required size; if they only barely exceeded the required size, they are criticized for it; if they manage to exceed it by a significant enough margin, they are given praise. If it is the players' first completion of the level, the King will automatically transform it into a star; if it is not, they are asked if they would like to turn it into a star or into stardust. Additionally, if they reach the size fast enough, a shooting star will be unlocked for the star. As an additional reward found in some of the games, players may be allowed to play a specific level without a time limit which allows them to play indefinitely.

Not all levels follow this format; for example, some do not have a timer, and instead require players to do a certain task, such as rolling a snowball to a certain size and putting it on a snowman. Some levels also require players to pick up a specific item, such as in the cow or bear levels where players are tasked with rolling  up the largest of that specific animal. Each level is presented on a stage select screen, and can be replayed multiple times after being completed. Each level also typically has two specific objects in them: one of The Prince's many cousins whom, after obtaining, can be used either in multi-player only or in multi-player and single-player, depending on the game. The other is a "Royal Present", which, after obtaining, may be used as an accessory for The Prince or cousins. The games keep record of every item rolled up, and players may view them in a book, which shows specific categories of items as well as % complete for each. Two players may play cooperatively or competitively together; in the cooperative mode, players are tasked with sharing control of the Katamari together with one player controlling one half of controlling the Katamari while another player controls the other in stages that resemble the single-player mode. The competitive mode puts two players against each other as they compete in an arena-like setting to get the largest sized Katamari; if one grows large enough, it can roll up the other player's katamari. Both modes are played with a timer.

Video games

The first video game released in the series was Katamari Damacy, which was released for the PlayStation 2 on March 18, 2004 in Japan. Due to the critical and commercial reception that it received, Namco Bandai followed it up with a 2005 sequel also for the PlayStation 2, titled We Love Katamari. It followed closely in the style of its predecessor, but with new environments and slightly improved physics.

A sequel was made in 2006 for the PlayStation Portable titled Me & My Katamari, which used a different scenario and different gameplay which required players to utilize the d-pad or analog nub and the face buttons in absence of the dual analog sticks used in most Katamari games.

In 2007, the first mobile phone version of Katamari was released, Katamari Damacy Mobile. The phone game utilizes both tilt controls as well as more traditional controls.

Another sequel, Beautiful Katamari, marked the first major Katamari title to be released for a non-PlayStation console, as well as the first to support high-definition television resolutions of 720p, 1080i and 1080p. While initially planned for both PlayStation 3 and Xbox 360, the former version was cancelled.

PlayStation 3 gamers had to wait until 2009 for a Katamari game. Katamari Forever was mostly a compilation of levels from previous games, with a new story and a few new levels.

Touch My Katamari was released in 2012 exclusively for the PlayStation Vita. Tap My Katamari, a version for mobile devices with iOS or Android, was released in January 2016.

Katamari Damacy Reroll is a remake of Katamari Damacy for the Nintendo Switch and PC, released on December 7, 2018, and for PlayStation 4 and Xbox One on November 20th, 2020.

Notes

References

External links

 
Bandai Namco Entertainment franchises
Video games with cel-shaded animation
Video game franchises
Video game franchises introduced in 2004